"Compliance" is a song by British rock band Muse. It was released as a single on 17 March 2022 as the second single from Will of the People, their ninth studio album.

Release 
"Compliance" was announced through Muse's social media channels on 11 March 2022, alongside a cryptic short video featuring a quote which explains the backstory of the song, which read as follows:

Additional social media posts were published on 16 March, the day before the release of "Compliance", confirming that both "Compliance" and previously released single "Won't Stand Down" will feature on Muse's upcoming ninth studio album, Will of the People.

Writing and composition
Lyrically, "Compliance" is an anti-establishment protest song, in common with previous Muse songs such as "Uprising". It features themes of oppression of the people, delivered from the perspective of the oppressor; lyrics such as "we have what you need, just reach out and touch" and "you will feel no pain any more" are an attempt to gaslight the population into accepting their oppressed state as being better than any alternative scenario. "Compliance" was released less than a month after the commencement of the 2022 Russian invasion of Ukraine, and the lyrics highlight the plight of the Ukrainian people by exposing Russia's perspective of the conflict; songwriter Matt Bellamy stated that, among other themes, the song references "new wars in Europe".

Musically, "Compliance" was described by Mike DeWald of Riff as a "melodic alt-pop rocker", while Ludovic Hunter-Tilney of Financial Times labeled the song as synth-pop. Muse lead singer Matt Bellamy said he thought the song was "the best pop track we've ever done".

Music video
The music video for "Compliance", directed by Jeremi Durand and shot in Poland, was released with the single on 17 March. The video features references to 2012 film Looper; three masked children, wearing masks resembling the band members, travel to a dystopian future in an attempt to destroy it and save their future selves. Much of the video is shot in reversed slow-motion. The music video shares a common theme with "Won't Stand Down", commencing with the same metallic masked figure who appeared in the music video for this single.

Live performances
"Compliance" made its live debut at a special invitation-only concert at the Cavern Club in Exeter, not far from the band's home town of Teignmouth, held on 7 April 2022. In contrast to the studio recording, it is usually played in a heavier, guitar-based version.

In live performances, the song is usually paired with "The Gallery", the B-side to 2001 single "Bliss", as an instrumental introduction. "The Gallery" made its live debut in this role at a charity concert to support the victims of the 2022 Russian invasion of Ukraine at the Hammersmith Apollo on 9 May 2022, 21 years after it was released.

Personnel
Credits adapted from Tidal.

Muse
Matt Bellamy – lead vocals, guitars, keyboards, production
Chris Wolstenholme – bass, production
Dominic Howard – drums, production

Production
Aleks Von Korff – additional production, engineering
Serban Ghenea – mixing
Chris Gehringer – mastering
Bryce Bordine – mixing engineer
Andy Maxwell – studio assistant
Joe Devenney – studio assistant
Tommy Bosustow – studio assistant
Chris Whitemyer – technical assistant
Paul Warren – technical assistant

Charts

Release history

References 

2022 singles
2022 songs
Muse (band) songs
Protest songs
Songs written by Matt Bellamy